Bangladesh participated in the 2014 Asian Games in Incheon, South Korea from 19 September to 4 October 2014. A total of 137 athletes from Bangladesh participated in 14 sports.

Medal summary

Medalists

Archery

Men

Women

Cricket

Men

All members of the Bangladesh men's cricket team have played for the Bangladesh national cricket team in 2014. Shohag Gazi and Al-Amin Hossain were initially named in the squad but were omitted after being reported for an illegal bowling action in September 2014, they were replaced by Shakib Al Hasan and Rubel Hossain respectively.

Mashrafe Mortaza (c)
Taskin Ahmed
Shakib Al Hasan
Mithun Ali
Mukhtar Ali
Anamul Haque
Shuvagata Hom
Nasir Hossain
Rubel Hossain
Tamim Iqbal
Imrul Kayes 
Mahmudullah
Sabbir Rahman
Shamsur Rahman
Arafat Sunny

Quarterfinal

Semifinal

Bronze medal match

Women

 Rumana Ahmed
 Sharmin Akhter
 Shohaly Akther
 Jahanara Alam
 Panna Ghosh
 Farzana Hoque
 Sanjida Islam
 Fahima Khatun
 Salma Khatun
 Khadija Tul Kubra
 Lata Mondal
 Shahanaz Parvin
 Shukhtara Rahman
 Shaila Sharmin
 Nuzhat Tasnia

Quarterfinal

Semifinal

Final

Football

Group B

Field hockey

Men

Group A

7th-8th-place play-off

Golf

Gymnastics

Artistic
Men

Kabaddi

Men

Preliminary round

Group A

Women

Preliminary round
Group A

Semifinal

Shooting

Clay Target

Small Bore and Pistol
Men

Women

Taekwondo

Men

Women

Volleyball

Beach

Weightlifting

Men

Women

Wushu

Nanquan\Nangun

Sanshou

See also
 Bangladesh at the Asian Games
 Bangladesh at the Olympics

References

Nations at the 2014 Asian Games
2014
Asian Games